Project Genesis may refer to:

 Project Genesis (Star Trek), a fictional technology from the Star Trek universe
 Project Genesis (organization), an Orthodox Jewish outreach organization that teaches Judaism on the Internet
 A project by Royal Caribbean International to develop their latest cruise ships—the Oasis-class cruise ship
 An alternate name for the TV series Deepwater Black
 Toyota Project Genesis, a 1999 plan to attract more youthful buyers
 Genesis (Final Fantasy character), a character in the Compilation of Final Fantasy VII
 Genesis Device, an LGPL licensed game engine
 Norton 360, codenamed Project Genesis or simply Genesis
 Project Genesis, a collaborative project between Freightliner, UK and General Electric for a main line freight locomotive, subsequently named PowerHaul
 Project Genesis, a demo (computer-based audio-visual work of art) by Hungarian demogroup Conspiracy

See also
 Genesis (disambiguation)